Bente Sætrang (born 15 September 1946) is a Norwegian textile artist. She was born in Oslo. Among her works are Manhattan from 1985, Signal 1,2 & 3 from 1986 for Norges Bank, and Tretten til bords i Bagdad from 2003 (located at the Norwegian Museum of Decorative Arts and Design). Her carpet Internight from 2004 was awarded a silver medal at the 11th International Triennial of Tapestry in Łódź. She was appointed professor at the Bergen National Academy of the Arts from 1988 to 1993.

References

1946 births
Living people
Artists from Oslo
Norwegian tapestry artists
Women textile artists